Adventures in Paradise is the third studio album by Minnie Riperton issued in May 1975 by Epic Records. The album rose to No. 5 on the Billboard Top Soul Albums chart and No. 18 on the Billboard 200  chart.

Background
After "Lovin' You" and Perfect Angel finished their chart run, Epic wanted a follow-up disc, and fast. With previous co-producer Stevie Wonder busy recording his Songs in the Key of Life (which Minnie would also turn up on singing backup on "Ordinary Pain"), Minnie and husband Richard Rudolph hired Stewart Levine to co-produce her next album. More songs came from the Riperton/Rudolph camp as well as collaborations with Jazz Crusader Joe Sample and songwriter Leon Ware (who was enjoying a hot streak thanks to his work on Marvin Gaye’s album I Want You). Guitarist Larry Carlton was brought in as an arranger. The result, Adventures In Paradise, took on a mellow soul-jazz tone.

The album was a standard recording but available in two formats: quadraphonic and stereo. Epic Records anticipated a soul funky sequel, using Family Stone and Tower of Power horn section, which would have been released in November 1975. However, the sessions were never released due to legal issues.

Music
The album's best known song is the sensual "Inside My Love". Riperton made it quite clear during the track's initial release that the song wasn't about a woman asking a man to have sex with her - it was about going deeper than that, attaining true intimacy. "Inside My Love" went to number 26 R&B during the summer of 1975, but stalled at #76 on the pop listings. Much of pop radio balked at playing the single due to the lyrical content (“Do you wanna ride, inside my love[...]”) even though Leon Ware claimed that the words were inspired by a church preacher he heard speak when he was a child (the minister said, “let us come into the house of the Lord”).

"Love and its Glory" was never a hit, but it is an epic love song of two teens struggling to be together, despite parental objections. The girl in the song is named Maya, which is the name of Riperton's daughter.

Artwork
On the album cover of Adventures in Paradise, Minnie is seen sitting serenely next to a lion. Though the actual album photo session was calm, things spiraled out of control on a promotional photo shoot with a different lion. The animal lunged at Minnie without any provocation. Fortunately, the animal’s tamer was on the set and the lion was quickly subdued. It was around this time that Riperton discovered she had cancer. In 1976, she told Flip Wilson on The Tonight Show that she was suffering from breast cancer and had undergone a mastectomy.

Track listing
All tracks written by Minnie Riperton and Richard Rudolph, unless otherwise noted.
{{track listing
|headline=Side One
|title1=Baby, This Love I Have
|writer1=Minnie Riperton, Leon Ware, Richard Rudolph
|length1=3:44
|title2=Feelin' That The Feeling's Good
|writer2=Riperton, Ware, Rudolph
|length2=4:22
|title3=When It Comes Down to It
|writer3=
|length3=3:24
|title4=Minnie's Lament
|writer4=
|length4=4:10
|title5=Love and Its Glory
|writer5=Riperton, Ed Brown, Rudolph
|length5=5:10
}}

 Personnel 
Minnie Riperton - vocals
Larry Carlton - arrangements, conductor 
Ed Brown - bass
Sid Sharp - strings
Stewart Levine - director
Dorothy Ashby - harp
Jim Gordon - drums, percussion
Rik Pekkonen - engineer
Dean Parks (tracks: 6, 7, 9), Larry Carlton, Richard Rudolph - guitar
Joe Sample - keyboards
Doug Sax - mastering
Kenneth McGowan - photography
Producer – Minnie Riperton, Richard Rudolph, Stewart Levine
Recorded By – Gary Starr
Jim Horn, Tom Scott - saxophones
Masaharu Yoshioka – liner notes

 Charts Singles'''

References 

1975 albums
Epic Records albums
Minnie Riperton albums
Albums produced by Stewart Levine
Albums recorded at Wally Heider Studios